The  is a diesel multiple unit (DMU) train type operated by Central Japan Railway Company (JR Central) on Hida and Nanki limited express services in Japan.

Technical specifications
The trains use stainless steel car bodies, consist of up to five cars per trainset and are powered by DMF14HZ engines. Two types of end cars exist, of which one has a gangway.

History
The trains entered service on February 18, 1989, and were the first independent train development of JR Central. They were introduced to replace aging ex-JNR DMUs such as the KiHa 80 series and to make the Hida service more attractive to tourists. 

They are scheduled to be replaced by new HC85 series hybrid trains.

References

External links

JR Central KiHa 85 series information 

Diesel multiple units of Japan
85
Train-related introductions in 1989